Melodic metalcore is a fusion genre, incorporating elements of melodic death metal and metalcore; it has a heavy emphasis on melodic instrumentation, distorted guitar tones, palm muting, double bass drumming, blast beats, metalcore-stylized breakdowns, aggressive screaming, death growls, and clean singing. The genre has seen commercial success for employing a more accessible sound at times compared to other forms of extreme music. Many notable melodic metalcore bands have been influenced by At the Gates and In Flames.

History

Origins

Melodic metalcore began to take form in the late 1990s and early 2000s, tracing its roots to Swedish melodic death metal groups such as At the Gates and In Flames. The stylistic origins of melodic metalcore and traditional metalcore differ greatly. Traditional metalcore evolved out of the hardcore punk scene in the late 1980s, when hardcore bands began to experiment with metal elements such as thrash metal guitar riffs and vocals. In contrast, melodic metalcore most often stemmed from American-based metal bands who began incorporating metalcore elements, such as metallic breakdowns, into their music. Florida's Poison the Well are considered the first melodic metalcore band, proving extremely influential to subsequent bands thanks to their first two albums The Opposite of December... A Season of Separation and Tear from the Red.
Massachusetts' Killswitch Engage are also considered to be a pioneering force in the genre, along with artists such as 7 Angels 7 Plagues, Chimaira, Dead to Fall, Heaven Shall Burn and Unearth. Of these bands, frequently cited influences include In Flames, Slayer, At the Gates and Pantera. Belgian groups also played a large part in the development of the genre in its early years, as bands such as Arkangel began embracing the sounds of melodic death metal in their traditional metalcore sound, as early as 1998.

Commercial success

Killswitch Engage released their sophomore album Alive or Just Breathing in 2002, which has been noted as a significant influence on many bands to follow, such as Jinjer, August Burns Red and Miss May I. By 2004 the genre saw increasing prominence, with Shadows Fall's The War Within debuting at number 20 on the Billboard album chart. Trivium released their sophomore album, Ascendancy, in 2005, which peaked at 75 on the UK Albums Chart, made the band one of the more prominent bands in the scene at that point, despite changing their style away from melodic metalcore on many occasions. Killswitch Engage's 2006 effort As Daylight Dies was described by Brandon Tadday of Overdrive Magazine as "without a doubt one of the most impactful releases for melodic metalcore during the mid-2000s", peaking at number 32 on the Billboard 200 and spending 22 weeks in the charts. In 2008 the All That Remains' single "Two Weeks" peaked at number 9 at the Mainstream Rock Tracks chart in the U.S., and on the Modern Rock Tracks chart at number 38. In 2007, the song "Nothing Left" by As I Lay Dying was nominated for a Grammy award in the "Best Metal Performance" category. An Ocean Between Us (the album that included "Nothing Left") itself was a commercial success, debuting at number 8 on the Billboard 200.

Welsh melodic metalcore band Bullet for My Valentine's third album Fever debuted at number 3 selling more than 71,000 copies in its first week in the U.S. and more than 21,000 copies in the UK during 2010 alone. Australian melodic metalcore band Parkway Drive's third album Deep Blue reached number three on the Billboard Rock Charts in 2010, along with Miss May I's album Rise of the Lion having reached number 6 in 2014. Melodic metalcore band Bury Tomorrow's fifth studio album Black Flame reached number eleven on the Billboard albums chart in less than a week.

Characteristics

Melodic metalcore bands often take influence from the guitar riffs and writing styles of Swedish melodic death metal bands, especially At the Gates, In Flames, Arch Enemy and Soilwork. Practitioners of the genre tend to make use of instrumental melody, and many prominently feature clean singing alongside typical death metal growls and screams. Melodic metalcore often promotes "very positive lyrical content." The genre can also feature harmonic guitar riffs, tremolo picking, double bass drums and metalcore-stylized breakdowns. Some bands include guitar solos. Bands such as Trivium, As I Lay Dying and Bullet for My Valentine take a significant influence from thrash metal.

See also
 List of melodic metalcore bands
 List of metalcore bands
 Melodic hardcore
 Post-hardcore
 Swedish death metal

References

Metalcore genres
Fusion music genres
Heavy metal genres
Hardcore punk genres
British rock music genres